Margaret McKenzie (c.1839 – 13 February 1925) was a New Zealand homemaker. She was born in County Tyrone, Ireland in c.1839.

References

1830s births
1925 deaths
19th-century New Zealand people
People from County Tyrone
Irish emigrants to New Zealand (before 1923)